Pauline Melville FRSL (born 1948) is an English-Guyanese born writer and former actor of mixed European and Amerindian ancestry, who is currently based in London, England. Among awards she has received for her writing – which encompasses short stories, novels and essays – are the Commonwealth Writers' Prize, the Guardian Fiction Prize, the Whitbread First Novel Award, and the Guyana Prize for Literature. Salman Rushdie has said: "I believe her to be one of the few genuinely original writers to emerge in recent years."

Background and early career
Melville was born in the former colony of British Guiana (present-day Guyana), where she spent her pre-school years in the 1940s; her mother was English, and her father Guyanese of mixed race, "part South American Indian, African and Scottish". 

The family moved to south London in the early 1950s, and after leaving school in the early 1960s, Melville worked at London's Royal Court Theatre, which would eventually lead to her becoming a professional actor. She first appeared in films in 1967, and in 1970–74 decided to further her education by doing a course in psychology and economics at Brunel University, then sought to combine art and politics by working with the Joint Stock Theatre Company and the Scottish theatre company 7:84. She also concerned herself with post-independence politics in Guyana and elsewhere in the Caribbean region, teaching literacy in Grenada and working at the Jamaica School of Drama, while beginning to write short stories.

As a performer, Melville was most active during the 1980s, appearing in such films as Mona Lisa and The Long Good Friday, along with television roles that include appearances in the sitcoms The Young Ones and Girls on Top.

Writing
According to Gadfly Online, "Much of Melville's writing is inspired by the people and events she observed while growing up in Guyana, a former British colony which didn't become independent until 1966. As a little girl and a teenager, Melville witnessed the complicated social problems of a nation locked in a desperate struggle to modernize and overcome its imperialist past. Today, an astounding number of cultures coexist in the region, in varying degrees of amicability, from European to Amerindian and African to East Indian, and the Guyanese have dealt with poverty, pollution and shortages of basic commodities, including electrical power."

Melville herself said in a 2010 interview: "Being a writer is like being a window-cleaner in a house or a castle where the windows are obscured by dirt and grime. Writing is like cleaning the windows so that people can see a view of the world they have never seen before."

Shape-Shifter (1990)
Her first book, the collection of short stories Shape-Shifter, was published in 1990 and won several awards, including the Commonwealth Writers' Prize for Best First Book (for Western Hemisphere region and Overall Best-Full Commonwealth), the Guardian Fiction Prize, and the PEN/Macmillan Silver Pen Award. A number of the stories deal with post-colonial life in the Caribbean, particularly in her native Guyana, as well as of some stories being set in London. Many of her characters, most of them displaced people from former colonies struggling to come to terms with a new life in Britain, attempt to find an identity, to reconcile their past and to escape from the restlessness hinted at in the title. Salman Rushdie described the collection as "notably sharp, funny, original...part Caribbean magic, part London grime, written in a slippery, chameleon language that is a frequent delight". Other critical acclaim included a review in Publishers Weekly of "this startling debut collection" that concluded: "Melville transforms the mundane yet never loses sight of social inequities or of the pleasures of laughter."

The Ventriloquist's Tale (1997)
Melville's first novel, The Ventriloquist's Tale (1997), won the Whitbread First Novel Award, the Guyana Prize for Literature, and was shortlisted for the Orange Prize for Fiction. In the book – which one reviewer characterised as "a unique look at the conflicts of ancient and modern ways" – Melville explores the nature of fiction and storytelling and writes about the impact of European colonisers on Guyanese Amerindians through the story of a brother and sister. According to Publishers Weekly: "In Melville's ambitious and richly realized debut set in modern-day Guyana, religious, social and philosophical tensions beset all the characters. ...Melville's nuanced characterizations, fluid prose, apt imagery and beautifully understated dialogue augment her skill as a raconteur. An unsentimental but moving narrative about the pain of longing, the book is mystical yet fiercely rationalist, ideological while coolly above politics ... brilliant, witty and complicated." Jay Parini wrote in The New York Times: "In this magnificent novel, Melville shows herself to be a discerning observer and a gifted satirist, the kind who takes no prisoners."

The Migration of Ghosts (1998) 
Her 1998 short-story collection, The Migration of Ghosts, is a book of complex layered tales of physical and emotional displacement. According to one reviewer: "A magnificent sense of pacing is the first of Melville's skills that impresses the reader of this mesmerizing collection. The second is her gift for voices ... she has an amazing range, from West Indians in London celebrating carnival, to the self-conscious, resentful Macusi Indian brought by her literal-minded British husband to a wedding in London, to the irritable Canadian wife whose husband has been sent to Guyana for two years to serve as unofficial liar for a mining corporation. Magic realism is the label most readers and critics will paste on Melville's work ... it is an appropriate but incomplete description. The dozen stories spill over with musical chaos and sly humor.... The magic in Melville's eccentric tales is neither good nor bad, white nor black, but the magic of the teeming pluralness and the many possibilities of life."

Eating Air (2009)
Melville's novel Eating Air, published in 2009, was called by The Independent "a virtuoso performance, playing with a gallimaufry of characters". Lavinia Greenlaw wrote in the Financial Times: "The world of Pauline Melville’s fiction is one in which people slip in and out of place. It is full of shadows, transgressions and dark secrets. In her second novel, Eating Air, it is a remarkably wide world, flitting from south London to Italy, Brazil to Surinam, across the past 30 years. ... What makes this novel compelling is the way one person leads us to the next, and how we move out of the frame only to find ourselves back at the centre. ...Melville does not need to rely on rhetoric or charm. Her clean style and detached vision allow us to concentrate on what these people actually do as opposed to what they set out to do. This is a book about the difference between intention and action – and how we are acted upon far more than we know."

The Master of Chaos and Other Fables (2021)

Of her most recent book, The Master of Chaos and Other Fables, Salman Rushdie was quoted as saying: "In this virtuoso performance, Pauline Melville shows us a world in upheaval, and reminds us that that's where we live." Benjamin Zephaniah writing in Vogue magazine praised the collection, saying: "There is love, politics, compassion, magic, and humour." Selecting "Anna Karenina and Madame Bovary Discuss Their Suicides" from the book as recommended reading, Brandon Taylor of Electric Lit stated: "How deftly Pauline Melville scummons these characters.... It's a marvel of a story about stories that asks probing questions about agency and narrative and what it means to take one's story back for oneself. All told with charm and warm intelligence."

Other literary activities and involvement 
In 1992, her essay "Beyond the Pale" was included in the anthology Daughters of Africa, edited by Margaret Busby, as was the poem "Mixed", first published in David Dabydeen's 1998 Rented Rooms.

In November 2012, Melville delivered a lecture entitled "Guyanese Literature, Magic Realism and the South American Connection" in the Edgar Mittelholzer Memorial Lecture series at the Umana Yana in Georgetown.

Melville was elected a Fellow of the Royal Society of Literature in 2018.

Awards and honours
1990: Commonwealth Writers' Prize (Regional and Overall Winner for Best First Book) for Shape-Shifter
1990: Guardian Fiction Prize for Shape-Shifter
1991: PEN/Macmillan Silver Pen Award for Shape-Shifter
1997: Whitbread First Novel Award for The Ventriloquist's Tale
1998: Orange Prize for Fiction (shortlist) for The Ventriloquist's Tale
1998: Guyana Prize for Literature for The Ventriloquist's Tale
2018: Elected a Fellow of the Royal Society of Literature

Bibliography
Shape-Shifter, London: Women's Press, 1990, ; Pantheon Books, 1991, 
The Ventriloquist's Tale, London: Bloomsbury Publishing, 1997, ; Bloomsbury USA, 1999, 
; Bloomsbury Publishing USA, 2000, 
Eating Air, London: Telegram, 2009, 
The Master of Chaos and Other Fables, Sandstone Press, 2021,

Filmography

Films
Ulysses (1967)
Far from the Madding Crowd (1967), as Mrs. Tall 
The Long Good Friday (1980), as Dora
Boom Boom, Out Go the Lights (1981), as Herself
Britannia Hospital (1982), as Clarissa
Scrubbers (1983), as Crow
White City (1985), as Woman in dole office
Mona Lisa (1986), as Dawn
How to Get Ahead in Advertising (1989), as Mrs. Wailace
The House of Bernarda Alba (1991)(TV), as Prudencia
Utz (1992), as Curator
Shadowlands (1993), as a Committee Chairwoman
Home Away From Home (1994), as Neighbour
Brighton Rock (2010), as Mother Superior

Television
The Young Ones (1982/84, BBC Two), as Woman on Bus (in episode "Demolition") and Vyvyan's mum (in episodes "Boring" and "Sick"), plus witch (in “Sick”)
Girls on Top (1985, ITV), playing Yvonne (three episodes)
Happy Families (1985), playing a Warder
Blackadder's Christmas Carol (1988), as Mrs. Scratchit
The Comic Strip Presents (1988), as Pauline Sneak in episode "Didn't You Kill My Brother?" 
Alexei Sayle's Stuff (1988)
Red Dwarf (1989), as Barmaid in "Backwards" (uncredited)
Alas Smith and Jones (1990) (two episodes)
2 Point 4 Children (1992), playing Babs in episode "Hormones"
The Young Indiana Jones Chronicles (1992), as Maisie Kemp in episode "London, May 1916"
Desmond's (1992), as Mrs. Martin in episode "Too Red Eye"
Spender (1993), as Judge in episode "The More Things Change"
Ghostwriter (1994), as Wise Rita (one episode)
The Bill (1997), as Mrs Austin in "No Trace", Season 13, Episode 136

References

Further reading
 John Thieme, "Throwing One's Voice? Narrative Agency in Pauline Melville's The Ventriloquist's Tale", Academia.edu. 2000.
 Helen Pyne-Timothy, "Reading the Signs in Pauline Melville's 'Erzulie'", Journal of Haitian Studies, Vol. 7, No. 1 (Spring 2001), pp. 136–147.
 Liliana Sikorska, "Pauline Melville’s marvels of reality", in Eyes Deep with Unfathomable Stories: The Poetics and Politics of Magic Realism Today and in the Past. Liliana Sikorska (ed.), Studies in Literature in English, Vol. 4.  Frankfurt: Peter Lang. 1988.
 Kathleen Williams Renk, "'Magic that Battles Death': Pauline Melville's Marvellous Realism", The Journal of Commonwealth Literature, Volume 44, issue 1 (1 March 2009), pp. 101–115.

External links

Pauline Melville, internationales literaturfestival Berlin

"The literary talents of Pauline Melville", Stabroek News, 30 November 2010 
Boyd Tonkin, "One Minute With: Pauline Melville", The Independent, 4 September 2009.
Anna Metcalfe, "Small Talk: Pauline Melville" (interview), Financial Times, 12 July 2010.
 "Pauline Melville - Frank Collymore Lit. Endowment Awards XVI, Pt 1", YouTube.

1948 births
Living people
20th-century British actresses
20th-century British novelists
20th-century British short story writers
20th-century British women writers
20th-century Guyanese writers
21st-century British novelists
21st-century British short story writers
21st-century British women writers
British film actresses
British television actresses
British women novelists
British women short story writers
Guyanese actresses
Guyanese novelists
Guyanese people of English descent
Guyanese people of indigenous peoples descent
Guyanese people of Scottish descent
Guyanese short story writers
Guyanese women novelists
Magic realism writers